The Great Victorian Collection, published in 1975, is a fantasy novel by Northern Irish-Canadian writer Brian Moore. Set in Carmel, California, it tells the story of a man who dreams that the empty parking lot he can see from his hotel window has been transformed by the arrival of a collection of priceless Victoriana on display in a vast open-air market. When he awakes he finds that he can no longer distinguish the dream from reality.

The book won the 1975 James Tait Black Memorial Prize for Fiction and, in Canada in 1975, the Governor General's Award for English-language fiction.

The American science fiction author and poet Thomas M. Disch included The Great Victorian Collection in his list of "modern classic" fantasy novels.

References 

1975 British novels
1975 Canadian novels
1975 fantasy novels
British fantasy novels
Canadian fantasy novels
Carmel-by-the-Sea, California
Farrar, Straus and Giroux books
Governor General's Award-winning fiction books
Jonathan Cape books
Novels by Brian Moore (novelist)
Novels set in California